Shri Guru Gobind Singh Ji Airport, Nanded   is a public airport located in Nanded, in the state of Maharashtra, India. It was inaugurated on 4 October 2008 by Union Aviation Minister Shri. Praful Patel and the then Chief Minister of Maharashtra, Vilasrao Deshmukh, with Kingfisher Airlines flying a special commemorative flight to Nanded airport using its ATR-72 turboprop aircraft.

History
The Nanded Airfield was built in 1958 by the Public Works Department. However, it remained underdeveloped for many years, being served only for a short while by regional carrier Vayudoot in the early 90s. In April 2000, the Maharashtra Industrial Development Corporation took over the development and maintenance of the airport.

To push trade in the region, the Maharashtra State Industries Ministry initiated the process of modernisation of airports operated by MIDC in 2006. Tenders were floated to invite private parties to draw out a plan for airport operations, as a result of which, the airport was leased to Reliance Airport Developers, a subsidiary of Reliance Infra that undertakes project management, implementation, and operation of airports, who currently operate the airport.

Structure
While the new terminal building, capable of handling 300 passengers at peak hours, featured six check-in counters, VIP lounges, departure and arrival lounges, transit suites & snooze cabins, visitors' waiting area, and cafeteria, the airside saw drastic improvements as well. The sole runway was extended from 1375 metres to 2300 metres. Runway width was also increased by 15 metres to 45 metres, making it capable of handling larger aircraft such as the Boeing 737 and the Airbus A320. A new night landing system and airfield lighting system was installed along with modern navigational aids.

The Directorate General of Civil Aviation awarded a provisional aerodrome licence to Nanded Airport in the public use category on 5 April 2010, and a permanent licence on 1 October 2010.

Passenger traffic at Nanded Airport in FY 2011 Q2 increased to almost 5,700 per month from 3,000 in the previous quarter.

Airlines and destinations

Statistics

See also
 Reliance Infrastructure
 Latur Airport
 Baramati Airport
 Osmanabad Airport
 Yavatmal airport

References

Airports in Maharashtra
Memorials to Guru Gobind Singh
Transport in Nanded
Airports established in 2008
2008 establishments in Maharashtra